

Countess of Cleves

House of Cleves, 1020/25–1368

House of La Marck, 1368–1417

Duchess of Cleves

House of La Marck, 1417–1609

Grand Duchess of Berg and Cleves

House of Bonaparte, 1806–1813

Notes

Sources

:nl:Hertogdom Kleef#Heersers van Kleef
:de:Herzogtum Kleve#Herrscher von Kleve

 
 
House of La Marck
Cleves
Cleves